Nicolas-François Canard (c. 1750 – 1833) was a French mathematician, philosopher and economist. He was one of the pioneers of applying mathematics to economic problems, forestalling the works of Antoine Augustin Cournot, William Stanley Jevons, and others.

Further reading

External links

Works by Nicolas-François Canard at Google Books

1750 births
1833 deaths
18th-century French mathematicians
19th-century French mathematicians
18th-century French economists
19th-century French economists